Enrique Villanueva, officially the Municipality of Enrique Villanueva, is a 5th class municipality in the province of Siquijor, Philippines. According to the 2020 census, it has a population of 6,790 people.

Geography

Barangays
Enrique Villanueva comprises 14 barangays:

Climate

Demographics

Economy

References

External links

 Enrique Villanueva Profile at PhilAtlas.com
 [ Philippine Standard Geographic Code]
 

Municipalities of Siquijor